The Wadi Kaam Dam is an embankment dam located on Wadi Kaam,  East of Khums in Libya, Libya. Completed in 1979, the primary purpose of the dam is water supply for irrigation.

The dam was designed and built by Energoprojekt Hidroinženjering, a subsidiary of the Yugoslavian engineering company Energoprojekt, under the supervision of Chief Engineer Stojan J. Čanović.

References

Kaam
Dams completed in 1979
1970s establishments in Libya
1979 establishments in Africa